Broughton and Appleby is an electoral ward in North Lincolnshire. It elects two councillors to North Lincolnshire Council using the first past the post electoral method, electing both councillors every four years. Since its creation in 2003 after boundary changes, it has continually elected Conservative councillors.

Geography
The ward encompasses the town of Broughton to the south along with the hamlets of Wressle, Castlethorpe, and Scawby Brook. The ward borders Ridge to south, separated by the A18 and the River Ancholme. Brigg and Wolds to the east, Frodingham, Town, and Crosby and Park to the west, and Burton upon Stather and Winterton to the North. To the north of the ward is the village of Appleby.

Councillors
Broughton and Appleby is represented in Westminster by Andrew Percy MP for Brigg and Goole.

The ward is represented on North Lincolnshire Council by two councillors: Janet Lee and Carol Ross. Both councillors were elected in the 2021 by-election to replace former councillor, Holly Mumby-Croft, who was elected to Parliament for the Scunthorpe Constituency in 2019. The other councillor Ivan Glover died in early 2020, shortly after the 2019 council election.

Electoral history

2021 By-election

2019 Council Election

2015 Council Election

2011 Council Election

References

Wards of Lincolnshire
Borough of North Lincolnshire
North Lincolnshire Council elections